Darnell Carlton (born August 20, 1974), better known by his stage name Crunchy Black, is an American rapper and hype man.

Career
He was a longtime member of the Oscar-winning hip hop group Three 6 Mafia from the group's founding until 2006. At the 78th Academy Awards in 2006, Three 6 Mafia and Frayser Boy won the Academy Award for Best Original Song for It's Hard out Here for a Pimp. Crunchy left Three 6 Mafia over monetary disputes involving his desire to forward his solo career.  Black's debut solo album entitled On My Own was released on September 19, 2006. Crunchy has said this album was released by DJ Paul and Juicy J without his permission. Crunchy's second solo album, From Me To You is also said to have been put out without his permission by DJ Paul and Juicy J. From Me to You reached 12 on the Billboard Top Heatseekers chart, 32 on the Top R&B/Hip-Hop chart, and 10 on the Billboard Top Rap albums chart. "On My Own" reached 3 on the Billboard Top Heatseekers chart, 163 on the Billboard 200, 15 on the Billboard Independent Albums chart, 28 on the Top R&B/Hip-Hop chart, and 13 on the Billboard Top Rap Albums chart.

In 2013, Crunchy Black joined Da Mafia 6ix, a reincarnation of Three 6 Mafia with DJ Paul, Lord Infamous, Koopsta Knicca and Gangsta Boo.

Crunchy contributed heavily to Platinum albums When the Smoke Clears: Sixty 6, Sixty 1, and Most Known Unknown, as well as Gold albums Da Unbreakables, and Chapter 2: World Domination with Three 6 Mafia. Crunchy is known for g-walking, which he says he started doing in Memphis Clubs but admits he is not the originator.

He was shot in the face and the leg in Las Vegas on July 1, 2012 and recovered very quickly from the injuries and was released from the hospital just days after the shooting.

Legal issues
In March 2014, Crunchy Black was arrested on two domestic violence charges and one possession of cocaine charge in Minnesota. Three felony warrants were issued by Stearns County, Minnesota. All three warrants carry nationwide extradition. He was incarcerated and has since been freed.

Discography

References

1974 births
Living people
African-American crunk musicians
African-American male rappers
American male rappers
Gangsta rappers
Rappers from Memphis, Tennessee
Southern hip hop musicians
Three 6 Mafia members
21st-century American rappers